The Shenzhen Metro is the rapid transit system for the city of Shenzhen in Guangdong province, China.
Shenzhen Metro is the 4th longest metro system in China and 4th longest in the world as of that date despite having only opened on 28 December 2004. By 2035 the network is planned to comprise 8 express and 24 non-express lines totaling  of trackage.

Current system 
Currently the network has  of route, operating on 16 lines with 369 stations. Line 1, Line 4 and Line 10 run to the border crossings between the Shenzhen Special Economic Zone and the Hong Kong Special Administrative Region at Luohu/Lo Wu and Futian Checkpoint/Lok Ma Chau, where riders can transfer to Hong Kong's MTR East Rail line for travel onwards to Hong Kong.

Line 1

Line 1, formerly known as Luobao line runs westward from Luohu to Airport East. Trains operate every 2 minutes during peak hours and every 4 minutes at other times. The line is operated by SZMC (Shenzhen Metro Group). Line 1's color is green.

 28 December 2004: Luohu – Window of the World
 28 September 2009: Window of the World – Shenzhen University
 15 June 2011: Shenzhen University – Airport East

Line 2

Line 2, formerly known as Shekou line runs from Chiwan to Liantang. Line 2 is connected with Line 8 at Liantang station. The line is operated by SZMC (Shenzhen Metro Group). Line 2's color is orange, the same as Line 8.

 28 December 2010: Chiwan – Window of the World 
 28 June 2011: Window of the World – Xinxiu
 28 October 2020: Xinxiu – Liantang

Line 3

Line 3, formerly known as Longgang line runs from Futian Bonded Area to Shuanlong in Longgang, in the north-east part of the city. Construction began on 26 December 2005. The line is operated by Shenzhen Metro Line 3 Operations, which has been a subsidiary of SZMC (Shenzhen Metro Group) since 11 April 2011 when an 80% stake was transferred to SZMC. Line 3's color is sky blue.

 28 December 2010: Caopu – Shuanglong
 28 June 2011: Yitian – Caopu
 28 October 2020: Futian Bonded Area – Yitian

Line 4

Line 4, formerly known as Longhua line runs northward from Futian Checkpoint to Niuhu. Trains operate every 2.5 minutes at peak hours and every 6 minutes during off-peak hours. Stations from Futian Checkpoint to Shangmeilin Station are underground. The line has been operated by MTR Corporation (Shenzhen), a subsidiary of MTR Corporation, since 1 July 2010. Line 4's color is red.

 28 December 2004: Fumin – Children's Palace
 28 June 2007: Futian Checkpoint – Fumin
 16 June 2011: Children's Palace – Qinghu
 28 October 2020: Qinghu – Niuhu

Line 5

Line 5, formerly known as Huanzhong line runs from Chiwan in the west to Huangbeiling in the east. Construction began in May 2009 and the line opened on 22 June 2011. Line 5 required a total investment of 20.6 billion RMB. The line is operated by SZMC (Shenzhen Metro Group). Line 5's color is purple.

 22 June 2011: Qianhaiwan – Huangbeiling
 28 September 2019: Qianhaiwan – Chiwan

Line 6

Construction began in August 2015 and the line opened on 18 August 2020. The line is operated by SZMC (Shenzhen Metro Group). Line 6's color is mint green. 

 18 August 2020: Science Museum – Songgang

Line 6 Branch 

Line 6 Branch, also known as Branch Line 6, runs from Guangming to SIAT in the north. The line opened on 28 November 2022. Line 6 Branch's color is teal.
 28 November 2022: Guangming – SIAT

Line 7 

It connects the Xili Lake to Tai'an. The line travels East–West across Shenzhen in a "V" shape. The line is operated by SZMC (Shenzhen Metro Group). Line 7's color is navy blue.
 28 October 2016: Xili Lake – Tai'an

Line 8 

It connects the eastern suburbs of Liantang to Yantian Road. However, this line serves as the extension of Line 2 in actual operation. The line is operated by SZMC (Shenzhen Metro Group). Line 8's color is orange, the same as Line 2.
 28 October 2020: Liantang – Yantian Road

Line 9 

Line 9, formerly known as Meilin line or Neihuan line of the Shenzhen Metro opened on 28 October 2016. It has 10 transfer stations. The line is operated by SZMC (Shenzhen Metro Group). Line 9's color is grey brown.
 28 October 2016:  – 
 8 December 2019:  –

Line 10

Construction began in September 2015 and the line opened on 18 August 2020. The line is operated by SZMC (Shenzhen Metro Group). Line 10's color is pink.

 18 August 2020: Futian Checkpoint – Shuangyong Street

Line 11 

Line 11, also known as the Airport Express, runs from Bitou in the northwest to Gangxia North in the city centre via Shenzhen Bao'an International Airport. Construction began in April 2012 and the line opened on 28 June 2016. The line is operated by SZMC (Shenzhen Metro Group). Line 11's color is maroon.
 28 June 2016: Bitou – Futian
 28 October 2022: Futian – Gangxia North

Line 12 

Line 12, also known as Nanbao Line, runs from Zuopaotai East in the southwest to Waterlands Resort East in the northwest. Construction began in 2018 and the line opened on 28 November 2022. Line 12's color is light purple.
 28 November 2022: Zuopaotai East – Waterlands Resort East

Line 14 

Line 14, also known as the Eastern Express, runs from Gangxia North in the city centre to Shatian in the northeast. Construction began in 2018 and the line opened on 28 October 2022. The line is operated by SZMC (Shenzhen Metro Group). Line 14's color is yellow.
 28 October 2022: Gangxia North – Shatian

Line 16 

Line 16, also known as Longping Line, runs from Universiade in the centre of Longgang to Tianxin in the northeast. Construction began in 2018 and the line opened on 28 December 2022. The line is operated by SZMC (Shenzhen Metro Group). Line 16's color is dark blue.
 28 December 2022: Universiade – Tianxin

Line 20 

Line 20 formerly known as Fuyong line runs from Airport North in the north-west to Convention & Exhibition City near Shenzhen World. Construction began in September 2016 and the line opened on 28 December 2021. The line is operated by SZMC (Shenzhen Metro Group). Line 20's color is light blue.
 28 December 2021: Airport North – Convention & Exhibition City

History

Early planning
In late 1983, Party Secretary of Shenzhen Mayor Liang Xiang led a team to Singapore to study its mass transit system. In 1984, the "Shenzhen Special Economic Zone Master Plan (1985–2000)" pointed out that, with the growing population and traffic in Shenzhen, a light metro system would not have sufficient capacity to meet future demand. Instead the report proposed a heavy rail subway line to be built along Shennan Avenue. The project was finally approved by the Central Planning Department in 1992.

In August 1992, during and re-feasibility and rail network planning, The Shenzhen Municipal Government decided to move from building a light metro line to a heavy rail subway line. The rapid growth of Shenzhen City made a lower capacity light metro line impractical. In 1994, Shenzhen organized the preparation of the "Shenzhen urban rail network master plan" to be incorporated into the "Shenzhen City Master Plan (1996–2010)". The city's vision for an urban rail network would consists of nine lines. Of the nine transit lines, three of them would be commuter rail lines upgraded from existing national mainline railways. The three upgraded commuter rail lines would overlap the Guangzhou–Shenzhen railway, Pinghu–Nanshan railway and Pingyan railway. This plan established the basic framework for the Shenzhen Metro network.

Construction suspended and restarted
In December 1995, the State Council issued the "moratorium on approval of urban rapid transit projects" to suspend approval of rail transit projects in all Chinese cities except Beijing, Shanghai, and Guangzhou. The Shenzhen Metro project was postponed. In 1996, prior to the handover of Hong Kong, authorities attempted to restart construction by renaming the project "The Luohu, Huanggang / Lok Ma Chau border crossing passenger rail connection project", stressing that the project is designed to meet the potential growing demand for cross-border passenger traffic after the handover.

In 1997, Shenzhen reapplied its Subway plans to the State Planning Commission, and received approval in May 1998. The project was renamed the "Shenzhen Metro first phase". In July 1998, SZMC (Shenzhen Metro Group). was formally established. By April 1999, the subway project feasibility study report has been approved by the state.

Phase I (1998–2004) 
Construction of the first sections of Line 1 and Line 4 began in 1999. The grand opening of the Shenzhen Metro system occurred at 5:00 pm on Tuesday, December 28, 2004. This made Shenzhen the seventh city in mainland China to have a subway after Beijing, Tianjin, Shanghai, Guangzhou, Dalian and Wuhan.

Initially the trains operated at 15-minute frequencies and consisted of Line 1 services between Luohu and Shijie Zhi Chuang (now Window of the World) and the Line 4 services between Fumin and Shaonian Gong (now Children's Palace). Initially the English names of the stations were rendered in Hanyu Pinyin, but some of the names were changed to English translation with American spelling in mid-2011.

The Futian Checkpoint station opened on 28 June 2007 using the name Huanggang.

Name changes
On April 23, 2008, Shenzhen Municipal Planning Bureau announced that it would change the nomenclature of Shenzhen's subway lines according to the "2007 Urban Rail Transit Plan Scheme". Instead of using numbers as the lines official designation, as typically used in other mainland Chinese metro systems, lines would be given Chinese names more akin to the Hong Kong MTR. In 2010, the Scheme was reviewed and adjusted with new routes and names in addition to newly proposed lines. On 23 October 2013, the SZMC (Shenzhen Metro Group) decided that current operational lines will have their number and names combined, while future lines will only be numbered. Due to the change in the construction order of several lines, some numerical names have been reviewed in order to prevent big jump between numbers. By 2016, only numerical names are used.

Lines currently in operation:

Lines under construction:

Phase II (2007–2011) 
From 2004 to 2007, there was a lack of official government interest and attention to expanding the subway after completion of Phase 1 with little or no active projects. Subway construction speed was ridiculed as "earthworm speed". On 17 January 2007 Shenzhen won the right to host the 2011 Universiade. In the bid Shenzhen committed to complete  of subway lines before the games. The mayor of Shenzhen at the time, Xu Zongheng, sharply criticized the speed and efficiency of Shenzhen's subway construction procedures and calls for reform. Subsequently, the Shenzhen municipal government and various departments signed a liability form, requiring Phase II subway expansion to be completed in time for the Universiade. Shenzhen Metro increased to over a hundred operating metro stations in June 2011, just before the Shenzhen Universiade games. This expansion increased rail transit's share of total public transit trips from 6% to 29% in 2014.

Phase III (2012–2020) 
In 2010, the Shenzhen Urban Planning and Land Resources Committee proposed a building program (Phase III) between 2011 and 2020. In 2011 this plan was approved by the NDRC. Phase III formally commenced in May 2011 with an expected cost of 125.6 billion yuan. In June 2011, the Shenzhen Urban Planning and Land Resources Commission started gather public input on Phase III station names. On June 28, 2016, Line 11 opened being the first subway line in Shenzhen with 8 car trains and  maximum service speed and the first in China with a First Class service. Lines 7 and 9 followed on October 28, 2016. South extension of Line 5 opened on 28 September 2019 and west extension of Line 9 opened on 8 December 2019.

Phase IV (2017–2025)
With the shortening of the Phase III implementation period, a number of lines (Lines 16 and 12) planned in 2007's Phase III moved into the next phase. Lines 13 and 14 which originally had a long term 2030 completion deadline were moved into Phase IV expansion. In addition, a branch line of Line 6 will connect with the neighboring Dongguan Rail Transit system. Lines 12, 13, 14, and 16 and branch of Line 6 was approved by the NDRC in July 2017 and started construction in January 2018.

Phase IV revised expansion (2020–2025)
The first phase of Line 20 was fast tracked from Phase IV to provide a shuttle between Line 11 and a new International Convention Center, now called Convention & Exhibition City. The construction started in September 2016, but as for early 2019, the construction is paused because the Development and Reform Commission did not approve the project. The Phase IV revised plan approved by the NDRC on March 26, 2020, approved the first Phase of Line 20 allowing for construction to continue. The line eventually opened on 28 December 2021. Futian to Gangxia North in the first section of Phase 2 of Line 11 opened on 28 October 2022.

Future expansion

Phase IV expansion 
Line 12, 13, 14, 16, and the branch of Line 6 was approved by the NDRC in July 2017.

Phase IV Revised Expansion 
The Phase IV revised plan approved by the NDRC on March 26, 2020, added a number of extension projects.

Phase V (2023-2028)
In the Shenzhen Metro 2007 masterplan proposed four more lines (Lines 13, 14, 15 and 16) which have a planned completion target of 2030. In 2016, all aforementioned lines but Line 15 were designated as part of the Phase IV expansion, moving the completion date forward from 2030 to 2022. In 2012, four further lines Qiannan (Line 17), Pinghu (Line 18), Pingshan (Line 19) and Fuyong (Line 20) where unveiled, making the total planned length of the Shenzhen Metro to  spread out over 20 lines. The first phase of Line 20 was fast-tracked and included in the Phase III revised expansion with a completion date of 2018. This leaves Line 15, 17-19 and the rest of Line 20 available for the next phase (Phase V) of subway expansion. In September 2022, the Shenzhen municipal government confirmed the projects proposed to be included in its phase V expansion.

Long-term plan
Aside from the set masterplan, at the 12th Guangdong Provincial People's Congress in January 2014, it was proposed to extend Line 4 beyond the planned Phase III terminus at the Songyuan Bus Terminal in Guanlan. The proposal wanted to further extend this line to reach the future planned Dongguan Metro Line 4 at Tangxia station. This proposal aims to shorten the distance between the two cities in residents' minds, boost tourism industries in both cities and expand housing options. It would also allow for direct connection between Hong Kong and Dongguan. As the area in the proposed area is less developed, the cost in building the line is expected to be lower, with a feasibility study yet to be conducted. In addition to metro lines, 5 Pearl River Delta Rapid Transit lines connecting neighboring urban centers in the Pearl River Delta such as Dongguan, Huizhou, Foshan and Guangzhou, totaling , have also been revealed. In 2016, an even more ambitious masterplan, expanding the previously planned 20 lines to 32, was unveiled. The new plan envisions a  subway network to be completed by 2030. This will allow for travel between the central and suburban districts to be shortened to 45 minutes and for public transit to make up more than 70% of all motorized trips in Shenzhen.

Ridership

Since the opening of the first phase in 2004, there has been a steady growth in passenger traffic. In 2009 and 2010, passenger traffic soared with major openings of new phase 2 lines, with a three-fold increase in passenger traffic in 2010. On 12 July 2019 it set a new record for its peak ridership at 6.63 million.

July is the busiest month of the year for the Shenzhen Metro, accounting for 9.3% of annual passenger traffic, while January is the least busy month, accounting for only 6.7%. This is caused by Shenzhen's large migrant worker population.

Fares and tickets
Metro rides are priced according to distance travelled, and fares vary from 2 RMB to 14 RMB. Since December 2010 fares are based on a usage fee (2 RMB) + a distance fee. For passengers who wish to ride on business coach in line 11, they have to pay 3 times the amount of price that calculated by the regulations above.

The metro also offers free rides to senior citizens over the age of 65, the physically disabled and military personnel.

Metro fares can be paid for with single-ride tokens, multiple-ride Shenzhen Tong cards or 1- day passes.

Tokens

When using cash, a RFID token (NXP Mifare Classic) is purchased and used for a single, non-returnable journey. There are two different types of tokens, with green tokens for Standard Class, and yellow tokens used for Business Class which is only available on Line 11. All ticket vending machines offer both English and Chinese interface. The purchaser touches a station name to calculate the fare. After payment, a green token is dispensed, which must be scanned at the entrance station and deposited at the exit station. A penalty applies should a token be lost. Purchasers of green tokens cannot ride Business Class on Line 11 directly. Instead, they must get off at any transfer stations with Line 11 and purchase a separate yellow token.

Note that as of 2015, many machines accept only 5 or 10 RMB notes. The token(s) are only valid at the station where issued. Passengers are unable to buy an extra token for return journey prior to departure. Baggage X-Ray machines are located at each station, and may be manned during peak hours.

Shenzhen Tong cards

Shenzhen Tong is a pre-paid currency card similar to Oyster Card system in London and the Octopus card system used in Hong Kong. The multiple fare card stores credit purchased at stations. The card can be used by waving it in front of the card reader located at all entrances and exits to the subway system. Riders who pay for metro fare with a card receive a 5% discount. Since 1 March 2008, riders who pay for a bus fare with a card and then a subway fare within 90 minutes receive an additional 0.4 RMB discount on the subway fare. Card users pay a distance based fare.

Since 30 June 2011, cards containing both a Shenzhen Tong and Hong Kong Octopus chip have been available in both Shenzhen and Hong Kong. There are plans to further integrate the two systems, and for a new card which will be accepted all over Guangdong province and China's two SARs.

Unlike Hong Kong Octopus Cards, Shenzhen Tong cards cannot be sold back to the stations or have faults dealt with by SZMC. Instead, the customer must go to the offices of Shenzhen Tong. Students studying in Shenzhen can use the Shenzhen Tong to receive a 50% discount.

Note that discounts are not applicable for people who ride Business Class carriages on Line 11.

Metro cards can also be used on Shenzhen's public bus system.

Metro 1-day passes
Metro 1-day pass is a smart card that allowed the card holder have unlimited access of the metro system in 24 continuous hours. Passengers can purchase a 1-day pass for RMB 25 in the service center in any metro station. The pass will be activated and the passenger will have 24 continuous hour for unlimited access after the first entrance. When the pass expired, the pass is no longer available for entering a station but able to exiting a station and finish a journey in 27.5 hours. The 1-day passes are not applicable for Business Class carriages on Line 11.

Station facilities, amenities and services
Some stations have toilets (free of charge), and public telephones. SZMC also operates luggage storage facilities in the concourse above Luohu Station. Mobile phone service is available throughout the system provided by China Mobile, China Telecom, and China Unicom.

Like the Hong Kong MTR, Guangzhou, and Foshan metros, station announcements are in Mandarin, Cantonese and English. Some announcements, such as train arrival, are in Mandarin and English only. Cantonese, an important local language, is chosen for the local Cantonese population as well as Cantonese speakers in Guangdong, Hong Kong and Macau.

The stations of Line 6 and Line 10 are the first metro stations in China to have 5G coverage.

Equipment

Rolling stock

Line 1 
 22 Bombardier Transportation Movia 456 6-car sets (101–122)
  4 Changchun Railway Vehicles Type A 6-car sets, traction units by Bombardier Transportation (123–126)
 26 Zhuzhou Electric Locomotive Works Type A 6-car sets, traction units by Siemens (127–152)
 33 Zhuzhou Electric Locomotive Works Type A 6-car sets, traction units by CSR Times Electric. (153–185)

Line 2 
 35 Changchun Railway Vehicles Type A 6-car sets, traction units by Bombardier Transportation (201–235)
 17 Changchun Railway Vehicles Type A 6-car sets, traction units by Bombardier Transportation (236–239、241–252), by CRRC Qingdao Sifang (240).
  5 Zhuzhou Electric Locomotive Works Type A 6-car sets, traction units by CRRC Times Electric (253–257)

Line 3 
 43 Changchun Railway Vehicles Type B 6-car sets, traction units by Hyundai Rotem (301–343, Some trains now use CRRC Times Electric traction units after have a maintenance in Changchun)
 33 Nanjing Puzhen Rolling Stock Works Type B 6-car sets, traction units by Hyundai Rotem (344–376)

Line 4 
 52 Nanjing Puzhen Rolling Stock Works Type A 6-car sets (401-452)

Line 5 
 22 Zhuzhou Electric Locomotive Works Type A 6-car sets, traction units by Siemens (501–522)
  8 Zhuzhou Electric Locomotive Works Type A 6-car sets, traction units by CSR Times Electric (523–530)
 21 Changchun Railway Vehicles Type A 6-car sets, traction units by Bombardier Transportation (531–551).
  6 Zhuzhou Electric Locomotive Works Type A 6-car sets, traction units by CRRC Times Electric (552–557)

Line 6 
 51 Nanjing Puzhen Rolling Stock Works Type A 6-car sets (601–651)

Line 6 Branch 
 9 Nanjing Puzhen Rolling Stock Works Type B 6-car sets (6Z01–6Z09)

Line 7 
 41 Changchun Railway Vehicles Type A 6-car sets, traction units by Bombardier Transportation (701–741)

Line 8 
 24 Zhuzhou Electric Locomotive Works Type A 6-car sets, traction units by CRRC Times Electric (258–281[801–824])

Line 9 
 29 Changchun Railway Vehicles Type A 6-car sets, traction units by CRRC Times Electric (901–929).
 22 Changchun Railway Vehicles Type A 6-car sets, traction units by INVT (930–951).

Line 10 
 35 Changchun Railway Vehicles Type A 8-car sets (1001–1035)

Line 11 
 33 Zhuzhou Electric Locomotive Works Type A 8-car sets (1101–1133)

Line 12 
 56 Nanjing Puzhen Rolling Stock Works Type A 6-car sets (1201–1256)

Line 14 
 44 Changchun Railway Vehicles Type A 8-car sets (1401–1444)

Line 16 
 32 Zhuzhou Electric Locomotive Works Type A 6-car sets (1601–1632)

Line 20 
 9 Changchun Railway Vehicles Type A 8-car sets (2001–2009)

Signalling system
On Line 1 and Line 4, Siemens supplied 7 (Phase 1) and 6 (Phase 2) LZB 700 M continuous automatic control systems; 7 (Phase 1) and 6 (Phase 2) electronic Sicas ESTT interlockings; the Vicos OC 501 operations control system with 2 operations control centers, fall-back level with Vicos OC 101 and RTU (FEP), 230 (Phase 1) and 240 (Phase 2) FTG S track vacancy detection units.

Line 2 and Line 5 use Casco CBTC system with 2.4 GHz frequencies, and so the system has suffered frequent problems with interference from consumer Wi-Fi equipment. By the end of November 2012, CASCO solved the problem on Lines 2 and 5 by switching to their standard solution with frequency diversity on 2 different channels.

Accidents and incidents
 4 April 2011 – One worker was killed and four others injured on April 4 when a manually controlled chain hoist broke loose in a Line 5 tunnel in Longgang district. A preliminary investigation by district safety authorities found mechanical failure was to blame.
 5 September 2012 – Service was suspended on Line 4 for several hours due to power outage.
 9 September 2013 – Three passengers abandoned in Line 1 tunnel after train door opens.
 17 February 2014 – Passenger passes out at Shuiwan station on Line 2 and dies after no help or CPR is provided for 50 minutes.
 25 June 2015 – Worker killed during tunnel collapse in Line 7 construction.
 19 April 2017 – Scaffolding for a metro station collapsed during the construction of the Line 8 on Yantian Rd, killing a worker and injuring three.
 11 May 2017 – During the construction of the extension of Line 3 heavy rains caused a partial cave in at an excavation pit for a station on the southern extension of Line 3, killing 2 workers and injuring another.
 30 October 2017 – A section of Line 9 tunnel near Shenzhen Bay Park station was damaged by unauthorized community drilling works above ground. While the damage was soon repaired, the line continued to operate at a lowered safety speed of 45 km/h for a week.
 6 December 2017 – Unauthorized drilling works for an adjacent bouldering site damaged the tunnel between Houhai and Hongshuwan South station of Line 11, causing sections of tunnel to make contact with a train and the driver to sustain minor injuries. The service of the line was disrupted for 12 hours while the line operated on modified routes, until the damage was fully repaired.
 23 December 2017 – A Line 11 train killed a suicidal man lying on the rails between Bihaiwan and Airport, disrupting the service for 80 minutes.
 5–7 July 2018 – Over a span of three days, at least seven incidents occurred, where power cables were accidentally cut at various construction sites of Shenzhen Metro, causing blackouts in large areas.
 10 July 2018 – During the construction of Line 10, workers accidentally dug up the pipes of Shenzhen Buji Water Supply Co., Ltd., disrupting water distribution system. The Shenzhen Economic and Information Commission warned and penalized the contractor responsible.
 Since 9 February 2020 – Service between Futian and Xinxiu on Line 2 was suspended due to geographic movement caused by the construction of Line 14.

Network Map

Connections
This 8.5km monorail line opened on 28th December 2022 with 11 stations, all in Pingshan district. Two of the stations will eventually connect to Line 16 stations.

See also
 List of Shenzhen Metro stations
 List of rapid transit systems
 Dongguan Rail Transit
 Foshan Metro
 Guangzhou Metro
 Hong Kong MTR

References

External links

 SZMC (Shenzhen Metro Group) official website (in English)
 MTR Corporation (Shenzhen) official website (Chinese only)

 
Rapid transit in China
Siemens Mobility projects
2004 establishments in China
Railway lines opened in 2004
Projects established in 1983
1500 V DC railway electrification